José Manuel Jiménez Ortiz (born 21 December 1981), known as Mané, is a Spanish former footballer who played as a left-back.

Over eight seasons, he amassed La Liga totals of 183 matches and five goals in representation of Almería (four years, two spells) and Getafe (four years). He also spent a few months in the Israeli Premier League late into his 18-year senior career, with Maccabi Tel Aviv.

Club career
Born in Tarifa, Province of Cádiz, Mané started playing professional football with lowly Real Balompédica Linense and CD Díter Zafra, being limited to just eight third division games with the latter team. In 2003, he moved to Atlético Madrid B of the same level.

For 2005–06, Mané progressed to the second tier, joining Ciudad de Murcia and scoring two league goals during his spell at the Estadio de La Condomina. The following season he moved clubs again, this time to UD Almería; he quickly became first-choice, being instrumental in the side's first-ever promotion to La Liga.

Mané's Almería performances were much admired over the course of 2007–08, represented by him being named in Sky Sports pundit Guillem Balagué's team of the campaign as the Andalusians overachieved and finished eighth with the player scoring twice, in 1–1 draws with RCD Mallorca and Recreativo de Huelva.

On 2 June 2009, after appearing in more than 100 league matches for Almería (68 in the league), Mané signed a four-year contract with Getafe CF. An undisputed starter throughout his first season, he scored his first goal for the Madrilenians on 13 April 2010, in a 3–0 home triumph against Villarreal CF.

On 2 July 2013, aged nearly 32, Mané moved abroad for the first time, agreeing to a two-year deal at Maccabi Tel Aviv FC. He made his debut 15 days later, starting against Győri ETO FC in the qualifying rounds of the UEFA Champions League. He returned to former club Almería on 23 December, signing for 18 months.

Retirement and later career
Mané retired in June 2018 at the age of 36, after two seasons with amateurs Algeciras CF. He then became their sporting director, leaving his post in early November 2019 after falling out with the board of directors.

In June 2020, Mané was hired as a youth coach at UD Castellar. In April 2022, he took charge of the club's first team, with seven games left of the season.

Personal life
From 2007 to 2009, Mané Ortiz was one of three Almería players with that surname, José Ortiz and Juan Manuel Ortiz being the others.

References

External links

1981 births
Living people
People from Campo de Gibraltar
Sportspeople from the Province of Cádiz
Spanish footballers
Footballers from Andalusia
Association football defenders
La Liga players
Segunda División players
Segunda División B players
Tercera División players
Real Balompédica Linense footballers
Atlético Madrid B players
Ciudad de Murcia footballers
UD Almería players
Getafe CF footballers
Algeciras CF footballers
Israeli Premier League players
Maccabi Tel Aviv F.C. players
Spanish expatriate footballers
Expatriate footballers in Israel
Spanish expatriate sportspeople in Israel